is a 2004 album by Japanese rock band GO!GO!7188.

Track listing 

GO!GO!7188 albums
2004 albums